Hina may refer to:

People and deities
 Hina (given name), including a list of people and fictional characters with the name
 Hina (chiefess), a name given to several noble ladies who lived in ancient Hawaii
 Hina (goddess), the name assigned to a number of Polynesian deities.
 Hina (singer), of 2021 group Lightsum

Other uses
 Hina, Cameroon, a town 
 Hina language, a Chadic language spoken in northern Cameroon
 HINA (Hrvatska izvještajna novinska agencija), the Croatian news agency
 Hina, a synonym of Gasparia, a genus of spiders
 Cyclone Hina (disambiguation), several tropical cyclones

See also

 Henna, a dye, and the temporary body art resulting from the staining of the skin from the dyes
 Hinamatsuri, or Girls' Day, is a religious holiday in Japan